Bleddyn Taylor (born 17 January 1959) was a Welsh rugby union player who played club rugby for Swansea RFC, Pontypool RFC, Neath RFC, Llanelli RFC, and Dunvant RFC. He also represented Wales A, Wales Sevens, and the Barbarians.

Club career
Taylor started his career at Pontypool RFC but soon joined Neath RFC at 17 years of age in 1976, as an outside half. He later rejoined Pontypool as a wing, where under the coaching of Ray Prosser, he achieved cult figure status in the Eastern Valley of Monmouthsire, scoring the winning try, when giants of the club game Pontypool lifted their only Welsh Cup in 1983 with an 18–6 victory over Swansea. The wing then moved to the All Whites after a brief stint with Llanelli where in 1990 he topped the Welsh Premier Division try-scoring charts. He later became player-coach during the rise of Dunvant through the divisions. He is now a director of Elite Maintenance Solutions, based in Llanelli.

Wales 'A'
1986 Wales Sevens
1990/91 Wales (World Cup Squad)
Barbarians

Notes

1959 births
Living people
Barbarian F.C. players
Llanelli RFC players
Neath RFC players
People educated at Gowerton Grammar School
Pontypool RFC players
Rugby union players from Bangor, Gwynedd
Swansea RFC players
Welsh rugby union players
Rugby union wings